The indigenous peoples of the Cordillera Mountain Range of northern Luzon, Philippines, are often referred to using the exonym Igorot people, or more recently, as the Cordilleran peoples. There are nine main ethnolinguistic groups whose domains are in the Cordillera Mountain Range, altogether numbering about 1.5 million people in the early 21st century.

Their languages belong to the northern Luzon subgroup of Philippine languages, which in turn belongs to the Austronesian (Malayo-Polynesian) family.

These ethnic groups keep or have kept until recently their traditional religion and way of life. Some live in the tropical forests of the foothills, but most live in rugged grassland and pine forest zones higher up.

Etymology 
From the root word golot, which means "mountain," Igolot means "people from the mountains", a reference to any of various ethnic groups in the mountains of northern Luzon. During the Spanish colonial era, the term was variously recorded as Igolot, Ygolot, and Igorrote, compliant to Spanish orthography.

The endonyms Ifugao or Ipugaw (also meaning "mountain people") are used more frequently by the Igorots themselves, as igorot is viewed by some as slightly pejorative, except by the Ibaloys. The Spanish borrowed the term Ifugao from the lowland Gaddang and Ibanag groups.

Cordillera ethnic groups 

The Igorots may be roughly divided into two general subgroups: the larger group lives in the south, central and western areas, and is very adept at rice-terrace farming; the smaller group lives in the east and north. Prior to Spanish colonisation of the islands, the peoples now included under the term did not consider themselves as belonging to a single, cohesive ethnic group.

Bontoc 

The Bontok ethnolinguistic group can be found in the central and east portions of the Mountain Province. It mainly consists of the Balangaos and Gaddangs, with a significant portion who identify as part of the Kalinga group. The Bontok live in a mountainous territory, particularly close to the Chico River and its tributaries. Mineral resources (gold, copper, limestone, gypsum) can be found in the mountain areas. Gold, in particular, has been traditionally extracted from the Bontoc municipality. The Chico River provides sand, gravel, and white clay, while the forests of Barlig and Sadanga within the area have rattan, bamboo and pine trees. They are the second largest group in the Mountain Province. The Bontoc live on the banks of the Chico River. They speak Bontoc and Ilocano. They formerly practiced head-hunting and had distinctive body tattoos. The Bontoc describe three types of tattoos: The chak-lag′, the tattooed chest of the head taker; pong′-o, the tattooed arms of men and women; and fa′-tĕk, for all other tattoos of both sexes. Women were tattooed on the arms only.

Ibaloi 

The Ibaloi (also Ibaloy, Ibaluy, Nabaloi, Inavidoy, Inibaloi, Ivadoy) and Kalanguya (also Kallahan and Ikalahan) are one of the indigenous peoples of the Philippines who live mostly in the southern part of Benguet, located in the Cordillera of northern Luzon, and Nueva Vizcaya in the Cagayan Valley region. They were traditionally an agrarian society. Many of the Ibaloi and Kalanguya people continue with their agriculture and rice cultivation.

Their native language belongs to the Malayo-Polynesian branch of the Austronesian languages family and is closely related to the Pangasinan language, primarily spoken in the province of Pangasinan, located southwest of Benguet.

Baguio, the major city of the Cordillera, dubbed the "Summer Capital of the Philippines," is located in southern Benguet.

The largest feast of the Ibaloi is the Peshit or Pedit, a public feast mainly sponsored by people of prestige and wealth. Peshit can last for weeks and involves the killing and sacrifice of dozens of animals.

One of the more popular dances of the Ibaloi is the bendian, a mass dance participated in by hundreds of male and female dancers. Originally a victory dance in time of war, it evolved into a celebratory dance. It is used as entertainment (ad-adivay) in the cañao feasts, hosted by the wealthy class (baknang).

Ifugao 

Ifugaos are the people inhabiting Ifugao Province. They come from the municipalities of Lagawe (Capital Town), Aguinaldo, Alfonso Lista, Asipulo, Banaue, Hingyon, Hungduan, Kiangan, Lamut, Mayoyao, and Tinoc. The province is one of the smallest provinces in the Philippines with an area of only 251,778 hectares, or about 0.8% of the total Philippine land area. It has a temperate climate and is rich in mineral and forest products.

The term "Ifugao" is derived from "ipugo" which means "earth people", "mortals" or "humans", as distinguished from spirits and deities. It also means "from the hill", as pugo means hill. The term Igorot or Ygolote was the term used by the Spanish colonial officials for mountain people. The Ifugaos, however, prefer the name Ifugao.

As of 1995, the population of the Ifugaos was counted to be 131,635. Although the majority of them are still in Ifugao province, some of them already transferred to Baguio, where they worked as woodcarvers, and to other parts of the Cordillera region. They are divided into subgroups based on the differences in dialects, traditions, and design/color of costumes. The main subgroups are Ayangan, Kalangaya, and Tuwali. Furthermore, the Ifugao society is divided into 3 social classes: the kadangyans or the aristocrats, the tagus or the middle class, and the nawotwots or the poor ones. The kadangyans sponsor the prestige rituals called hagabi and uyauy and this separates them from the tagus who cannot sponsor feasts but are economically well off. The nawotwots are those who have limited land properties and are usually hired by the upper classes to do work in the fields and other services.

Kalanguya/Ikalahan 

The Kalanguya or Ikalahan people are a small group distributed amongst the mountain ranges of Sierra Madre, the Caraballo Mountains, and the eastern part of the Cordillera mountain range. The main population resides in the Nueva Vizcaya province, with Kayapa as the center. They are considered to be part of the Igorot (mountain people) but distinguish themselves with the name Ikalahan, the name taken from the forest trees that grow in the Caraballo Mountain.

They are among the least studied ethnic groups, thus their early history is unknown. However, Felix M. Keesing suggests that, like other groups in the mountains, they fled from the lowlands to escape Spanish persecution.

Isneg 

The Isnag, also Isneg or Apayao, live at the northwesterly end of northern Luzon, in the upper half of the Cordillera province of Apayao. The term "Isneg" derives from itneg, meaning inhabitants of the Tineg River.  Apayao derives from the battle cry Ma-ap-ay-ao as their hand is clapped rapidly over their mouth. They may also refer to themselves as Imandaya if they live upstream, or Imallod if they live downstream. The municipalities in the Isneg domain include Pudtol, Kabugao, Calanasan, Flora, Conner, Sta. Marcela, and
Luna. Two major river systems, the Abulog River and the Apayao River, run through Isnag country.

Jars of basi are half-buried in the ground within a small shed, abulor, constructed of 4 posts and a shed. This abulor is found within the open space, linong or sidong, below their houses (balay).  They grow upland rice, while also practicing swidden farming and fishing.

Say-am was an important ceremony after a successful headhunting, or other important occasions, hosted by the wealthy, and lasting one to five days or more. Dancing, singing, eating, and drinking mark the feast, and Isnegs wear their finest clothes.  The shaman, Anituwan, prays to the spirit Gatan, before the first dog is sacrificed, if a human head had not been taken, and offered at the sacred tree, ammadingan. On the last day, a coconut is split in honor of the headhunter guardian, Anglabbang.The Pildap is an equivalent say-am but hosted by the poor. Conversion to Christianity grew after 1920, and today, the Isnegs are divided in their religious beliefs, with some still being animistic.

Itneg/Tingguian 

The Itneg people, also known as Tingguian people, live in the mountainous area of Abra in northwestern Luzon who descended from immigrants from Kalinga, Apayao, and the Northern Kankana-ey. They are large in stature, have mongoloid eyes, aquiline nose, and are effective farmers. They refer to themselves as Itneg, though the Spaniards called them Tingguian when they came to the Philippines because they are mountain dwellers. The Tingguians are further divided into 11 distinct subgroups which are the Adasen, Balatok, Banao, Belwang, Binongan, Gobang, Inlaud, Mabaka, Maeng, Masadiit and Moyadan. Wealth and material possessions (such as Chinese jars, copper gongs called gangsa, beads, rice fields, and livestock) determine the social standing of a family or person, as well as the hosting of feasts and ceremonies. Despite the divide of social status, there is no sharp distinction between rich (baknang) and poor. Wealth is inherited but the society is open for social mobility of the citizens by virtue of hard work. Medium are the only distinct group in their society, but even then it is only during ceremonial periods.

Kalinga 

The Kalingas are mainly found in Kalinga province which has an area of 3,282.58 sq. km. Some of them, however, already migrated to Mountain Province, Apayao, Cagayan, and Abra. As of 1995, they were counted to be 105,083, not including those who have migrated outside the Cordillera region.

Kalinga territory includes floodplains of Tabuk, and Rizal, plus the Chico River. Gold and copper deposits are common in Pasil and Balbalan. Tabuk was settled in the 12th century, and from there other Kalinga settlements spread, practicing wet rice (papayaw) and swidden (uwa) cultivation. Kalinga houses (furoy, buloy, fuloy, phoyoy, biloy)are either octagonal for the wealthy, or square, and are elevated on posts (a few as high as 20–30 feet), with a single room. Other building include granaries (alang) and field sheds (sigay).

The name Kalinga came from the Ibanag and Gaddang term kalinga, which means headhunter. Edward Dozier divided Kalinga geographically into three sub-cultures and geographical position: Balbalan (north); Pasil, Lubuagan, and Tinglayan (south); and Tanudan (east). Teodoro Llamzon divided the Kalinga based on their dialects: Guinaang, Lubuagan, Punukpuk, Tabuk, Tinglayan, and Tanudan.

Kankanaey 

The Kankanaey domain includes Western Mountain Province, northern Benguet and southeastern Ilocos Sur. Like most Igorot ethnic groups, the Kankanaey built sloping terraces to maximize farm space in the rugged terrain of the Cordilleras.

Kankanaey houses include the two-story innagamang, the larger binangi, the cheaper tinokbob, and the elevated tinabla. Their granaries (agamang) are elevated to avoid rats. Two other institutions of the Kankanaey of Mountain Province are the dap-ay, or the men's dormitory and civic center, and the ebgan, or the girls' dormitory.

Kankanaey's major dances include tayaw, pat-tong, takik (a wedding dance), and balangbang. The tayaw is a community dance that is usually done in weddings it maybe also danced by the Ibaloi but has a different style. Pattong, also a community dance from Mountain Province which every municipality has its own style, while Balangbang is the dance's modern term. There are also some other dances like the sakkuting, pinanyuan (another wedding dance) and bogi-bogi (courtship dance).

Ethnic groups by linguistic classification 

Below is a list of northern Luzon ethnic groups organized by linguistic classification.
 Northern Luzon languages
 Ilokano (Ilocos Norte, Ilocos Sur, and La Union)
 Northern Cordilleran
 Isneg (northern Apayao)
 Gaddang (Nueva Vizcaya and Isabela)
 Ibanagic
 Ibanag (Cagayan and Isabela)
 Itawis (southern Cagayan)
 Yogad (Isabela)
 Central Cordilleran
 Isinai (northern Nueva Vizcaya, north Nueva Ecija, northwest Aurora)
 Kalinga–Itneg
 Kalinga (Kalinga)
 Itneg (Abra)
 Nuclear
 Ifugao (Ifugao)
 Balangao (eastern Mountain Province)
 Bontok (central Mountain Province)
 Kankanaey (western Mountain Province, northern Benguet)
 Southern Cordilleran
 Ibaloi (southern Benguet, east La Union, west Nueva Vizcaya)
 Kalanguya/Kallahan (eastern Benguet, Ifugao, northwestern Nueva Vizcaya, north Nueva Ecija)
 Kalanguya Keley-i 
 Kalanguya Kayapa 
 Kalanguya Tinoc 
 Karao (Karao, Bokod, Benguet)
 Bugkalot/Ilongot (eastern Nueva Vizcaya, western Quirino, north Nueva Ecija, northwest Aurora)
 Pangasinan (Pangasinan)

History

Spanish colonial era 
The gold found in the land of the Igorot was an attraction for the Spanish. Originally gold was exchanged at Pangasinan by the Igorot. The gold was used to buy consumable products by the Igorot. Both gold and desire to Christianize the Igorot were given as reasons for Spanish conquest. In 1572 the Spanish started hunting for the gold. Benguet Province was entered by the Spanish with the intention of obtaining gold. The fact that the Igorots managed to stay out of Spanish dominion vexed the Spaniards. The gold evaded the hands of the Spaniards due to Igorot opposition. The Igorot would also be used as mercenaries and scouts during the Philippine Revolution and the Philippine-American War.

American colonial era 
Samuel E. Kane wrote about his life amongst the Bontoc, Ifugao, and Kalinga after the Philippine–American War in his book Thirty Years with the Philippine Head-Hunters (1933). The first American school for Igorot girls was opened in Baguio in 1901 by Alice McKay Kelly. Kane argued that Dean C. Worcester "did more than anyone man to stop head-hunting and to bring the traditional enemy tribes together in friendship." Kane wrote of the Igorot people, "there is a peace, a rhythm and an elemental strength in the life...which all the comforts and refinements of civilization can not replace...fifty years hence...there will be little left to remind the young Igorots of the days when the drums and ganzas of the head-hunting canyaos resounded throughout the land.

In 1903, Missionary Bishop Charles Brent traveled through northern Luzon, in hopes of directing missionary efforts to convert the pagan Igorot populace. A mission church was established for the Bontoc Tribe of the Igorots in the Bontoc, Mountain Province. The Bontoc missionaries wrote the first Igorot grammars, which were published by the government.

In 1904, a group of Igorot people were brought to St. Louis, Missouri, United States, for the St. Louis World's Fair. They constructed the Igorot Village in the Philippine Exposition section of the fair, which became one of the most popular exhibits. The poet T. S. Eliot, who was born and raised in St. Louis, visited and explored the Village. Inspired by their tribal dance and others, he wrote the short story, "The Man Who Was King" (1905). In 1905, 50 tribespeople were on display at a Brooklyn, New York, amusement park for the summer, ending in the custody of the unscrupulous Truman Hunt, a showman "on the run across America with the tribe in tow."

On February 12, 1912, a Mountain Province Igorot chief named Gagaban became the first Filipino to fly in an airplane, riding as a passenger in a biplane called the "Red Devil" with Lee Hammond as the pilot.

World War II 
During the Japanese occupation of the Philippines, Igorots fought against Japan. Donald Blackburn's World War II guerrilla force had a strong core of Igorots. A young Igorot woman, Naomi Flores, was an important member of the Miss U Spy Ring.

Postwar era 
On June 18, 1966, Republic Act No. 4695 was enacted to split Mountain Province and create four separate and independent provinces namely Benguet, Ifugao, Kalinga-Apayao, and Mountain Province. Ifugao and Kalinga-Apayao were placed under the jurisdiction of the Cagayan Valley region, with Benguet and Mountain Province placed under the Ilocos Region.

Martial law 

After the declaration of Martial law by Ferdinand Marcos in 1972, the region became the focus of militarization as a result of local objections to the government's push for the Chico River Dam Project near Sadanga, Mountain Province and Tinglayan, Kalinga. Frustrated by the project delays caused by the opposition, Ferdinand Marcos issued Presidential Decree no. 848 in December 1975, constituting the municipalities of Lubuagan, Tinglayan, Tanudan, and Pasil into a "Kalinga Special Development Region" (KSDR), in an effort to neutralize opposition to the Chico IV dam.

Empowered by Martial Law to conduct warrantless arrests, the 60th PC Brigade had arrested at least 150 locals by April 1977, accusing them of supposed subversion and of obstructing government projects, and various other offenses such as boycotting the October 1976 Constitutional Referendum. Individuals arrested included tribal papangat (leaders/elders), young couples, and in at least one case, a 12-year-old child. By December 1978, parts of the Chico IV area had been declared "free fire zones", no-man's-land areas where the army could freely fire on any animals or permit-less humans at will.

On April 24, 1980, Marcos-controlled military forces assassinated Macli-ing Dulag, a pangat (leader) of the Butbut tribe of Kalinga. The assassination became a watershed moment, marking the first time the mainstream Philippine press could be openly critical against Marcos and the military, and building up a sense of Igorot identity that eventually led to Cordillera autonomy.

Mount Data Peace Accord 

After the end of the Marcos administration due to the 1986 People Power Revolution, the succeeding government under President Corazon Aquino secured a ceasefire with the main indigenous armed group in the Cordilleras, the Cordillera People's Liberation Army led by Conrado Balweg. The Aquino government made a sipat or indigenous treaty, which would be known as the Mount Data Peace Accord, with the CPLA on September 13, 1986, ending hostilities.

Contemporary history 
In 2014, Victoria Tauli-Corpuz, an indigenous rights advocate, of Igorot ethnicity, was appointed UN Special Rapporteur on the Rights of Indigenous Peoples.

In February 2021, Mountain Province Representative Maximo Y. Dalog Jr. wrote Philippine Education Secretary Leonor Briones to look into learning materials that allegedly discriminated against Igorots for their physical appearance and manner of dress. One learning module inaccurately described Igorots as having curly hair. Department of Education Regional Director Estela L. Cariño apologized on behalf of the department, noting that copies of the book were retrieved when its contents were brought to the department's attention.

See also 
 Ethnic groups in the Philippines
 Indigenous peoples of the Philippines
 Lumad
 Moro people

References

Further reading 
 Boeger, Astrid. 'St. Louis 1904'. In Encyclopedia of World's Fairs and Expositions, ed. John E. Findling and Kimberly D. Pelle. McFarland, 2008.
 
 Jones, Arun W, “A View from the Mountains: Episcopal Missionary Depictions of the Igorot of Northern Luzon, The Philippines, 1903-1916” in Anglican and Episcopal History 71.3 (Sep 2002): 380-410.
 Narita, Tatsushi."How Far is T. S. Eliot from Here?: The Young Poet's Imagined World of Polynesian Matahiva". In How Far is America from Here?, ed. Theo D'haen, Paul Giles, Djelal Kadir and Lois Parkinson Zamora. Amsterdam and New York: Rodopi, 2005, pp. 271–282.
 Narita, Tatsushi. T. S. Eliot, the World Fair of St. Louis and 'Autonomy''' (Published for Nagoya Comparative Culture Forum). Nagoya: Kougaku Shuppan Press, 2013.
 Rydell, Robert W. All the World's a Fair: Visions of Empire at American International Expositions, 1876–1916''. The University of Chicago Press, 1984.

External links 

 The Igorots in St. Louis Fair 1904 
 Jenks' The Bontoc Igorot
 Project Gutenberg

 
 
Headhunting
Cordillera Administrative Region
Ethnic groups in the Philippines